The Kite String Tangle (also known as TKST) is the solo project of Brisbane-based alternative electronic artist, multi-instrumentalist, and producer Danny Harley. Harley launched the project in 2012 and released an EP titled Vessel in 2014. He has since issued three studio albums, The Kite String Tangle in 2017, The Kite String Tangle Presents: In a Desperate Moment in 2018, and C()D3X in 2020.

Biography
The Kite String Tangle released "Given the Chance" as the first single under the moniker in 2013, and it was voted into Triple J's Hottest 100 of 2013.

In August 2014, TKST released his debut EP Vessel, which peaked at number 8 on the ARIA charts.
At the ARIA Music Awards of 2014, the EP was nominated for an ARIA Award for Breakthrough Artist.

In 2014, TKST performed at Falls Festival in Marion Bay, Byron Bay, and Lorne, and also performed at regional festival Groovin' the Moo. In 2015, he performed at SxSW and accompanied Adventure Club at Coachella.

On 14 July 2017, The Kite String Tangle released his debut self-titled album. It peaked at number 36 on the ARIA Charts.

On 13 April 2018, a mini-album, titled The Kite String Tangle Presents: In a Desperate Moment, was released.

In 2019, TKST released the singles "P()l4r" and "Killing Time".

On 31 January 2020, alongside the release of his new single "North", Harley announced that his second studio album, C()D3X, would be released on 20 March 2020.

Discography

Studio albums

Mini albums

Extended plays

Singles

As lead artist

Awards and nominations

ARIA Music Awards
The ARIA Music Awards is an annual awards ceremony that recognises excellence, innovation, and achievement across all genres of Australian music. The Kite String Tangle has been nominated for two awards.

|-
| 2014
| Vessel
| Breakthrough Artist
| 
|-
| 2017
| The Kite String Tangle
| Best Dance Release
| 
|-

National Live Music Awards
The National Live Music Awards (NLMAs) are a broad recognition of Australia's diverse live industry, celebrating the success of the Australian live scene. The awards commenced in 2016.

|-
| National Live Music Awards of 2018
| The Kite String Tangle
| Live Electronic Act (or DJ) of the Year
| 
|-

Queensland Music Awards
The Queensland Music Awards (previously known as Q Song Awards) are annual awards celebrating Queensland, Australia's brightest emerging artists and established legends. They commenced in 2006.
 
|-
| 2015
| "Arcadia" (directed by Daniel Harley)
| Video of the Year 
| 
|-
| 2018
| "The Prize" (featuring Bridgette Amofah)
| Electronic Song of the Year
| 
|-
| 2019
| "Give it Time" (featuring Aalias)
| Electronic Song of the Year
| 
|-
|rowspan="2"| 2020
|rowspan="2"| "P()l4r"
| Electronic Song of the Year
| 
|-
| Video of the Year
| 
|-

References

External links
 Official website

Australian rock music groups
Australian pop music groups
Australian electronic music groups
Australian indie pop musicians
Musical groups established in 2012
2012 establishments in Australia